Frederick Michael O'Brien (17 April 1878 – 26 October 1951) was an Australian rules footballer who played with South Melbourne in the Victorian Football League (VFL).

Recruited from South Adelaide where he had played since 1898, O'Brien played for South Melbourne in Rounds 2 and 3 of the 1905 VFL season, scoring a goal in his second appearance.

Notes

External links 

1878 births
1951 deaths
Australian rules footballers from Victoria (Australia)
Sydney Swans players